Devadatta is a genus of damselflies in the family Devadattidae which is a sister-group of the Chlorocyphidae. There are about 13 described species in Devadatta.

The genus has sometimes been placed in the family Amphipterygidae. Species in the genus are found in Southeast Asia with several species in Borneo.

Species
These 13 species belong to the genus Devadatta:

 Devadatta aran Dow, Hämäläinen & Stokvis, 2015
 Devadatta argyoides (Selys, 1859)
 Devadatta basilanensis Laidlaw, 1934
 Devadatta clavicauda Dow, Hämäläinen & Stokvis, 2015
 Devadatta cyanocephala Hämäläinen, Sasamoto & Karube, 2006
 Devadatta ducatrix Lieftinck, 1969
 Devadatta glaucinotata Sasamoto, 2003
 Devadatta kompieri Phan, Sasamoto & Hayashi, 2015
 Devadatta multinervosa Fraser, 1933
 Devadatta podolestoides Laidlaw, 1934
 Devadatta sokoh Dow, Hämäläinen & Stokvis, 2015
 Devadatta tanduk Dow, Hämäläinen & Stokvis, 2015
 Devadatta yokoii Phan, Sasamoto & Hayashi, 2015

References

Further reading

 

Calopterygoidea
Zygoptera genera